The BMW M4 is a high-performance version of the BMW 4 Series coupes and convertibles developed by BMW's motorsport division, BMW M, and marketed since 2014.

As part of the renumbering that splits the 3 Series coupé and convertible models into the 4 Series, the M4 replaced the BMW M3 coupé and convertible models. Upgrades over the standard BMW 4 Series include an upgraded engine, suspension, exhaust system, brakes and weight reduction measures including increased use of carbon fibre, such as on the roof of the car.



First generation (F82/F83; 2014) 

On 25 September 2013, BMW released the technical specifications of the M4. It is powered by the S55B30 engine, which is developed and engineered by BMW M GmbH. This 3.0-litre inline-6 engine has been built specifically for the new M4/M3, having a redline of 7,600 rpm with the rev limiter actuated at 7,300 rpm. The engine's torque is rated at  throughout the range of 1,850–5,500. Two transmission choices are available, the 6-speed manual and the 7-speed M-DCT transmissions.

As per its E92 predecessor, the roof of the coupe model is constructed from carbon fibre (except if the optional sunroof is fitted). Carbon fibre is also used for the bootlid and engine brace. For the first time in a M3/M4 model, an electric power steering unit is used. The steering system is specifically tuned for both the M3 and M4, however it has been criticised for lacking in feel. The  and  wheel options are available with lightweight forged alloy wheels being standard. The M compound brakes come standard (with blue brake calipers), while carbon ceramic brakes (with gold brake calipers) are available as an option.

The M4 features Active Sound, live amplification of the engine's natural sound inducted into the passenger cabin via speakers in the car. BMW claims this technology has been used so that the well insulated cabin can reduce road/wind noise but still provide the driver with the sporty sound of the M powered engine. There are no artificial sound or any pre-recorded track in the system. This system was first implemented in the M5 (F10).

The M4 is based on the F32 4 Series however 50 percent of its components are unique as compared to the 4 Series.

The convertible variant of the M4 was announced along with its coupe sibling, also internally known as F82 or F83 M4. It shares almost everything with the coupé version, but weighs more due to its folding metal roof. The convertible weighs  (manual),  (M-DCT). The three-piece retractable hardtop folds in 20 seconds. The only significant difference between the two is the weight due to its retractable hardtop. Like its hardtop counterpart, the F83 M4 uses carbon fibre reinforced plastic to lighten and stiffen the car.

The dynamic differences between the two variants are marginally small.

Starting from the 2019 model year (production from 07/2018 onward) BMW removed the carbon fibre driveshaft so as to be able to fit an Otto Particulate Filter (OPF), necessary to comply with WLTP emissions regulations and this also meant that the M Performance Exhaust was no longer able to be offered on these cars by BMW.

M4 Design Variants / Editions

M4 Competition Package
In February 2016, BMW announced the M4 Competition Package. The M4 Competition Package boasts  and a revised suspension for better handling. New springs, dampers and anti-roll bars complement the included Adaptive M Suspension. BMW also re-tuned the electronic differential and the Dynamic Stability Control to match the upgraded hardware. The interior remains largely unchanged, but Competition Package cars get new lightweight sport seats along with the M-striped woven seat belts. The exterior includes the M Sport exhaust with black chrome tailpipes and high gloss Shadow Line exterior trim. Gloss black trim is added to the kidney grille, side gills, and model badge on the trunk.

With the Competition Package, the coupe version accelerates from standstill to 100 km/h (62 mph) in 4.0 seconds.

There is a convertible version, and that does the run in 4.2 seconds, both coupe and convertible forms using the dual clutch transmission.

M4 GTS
BMW introduced the M4 GTS concept in August 2015 at the Pebble Beach Concours d'Elegance. In 2016, BMW introduced the production version of the car which was a track-focused version of the standard M4 coupé itself with a limited production run of 700 units. The M4 GTS has, according to BMW, lapped the infamous Nürburgring Nordschleife track in 7 minutes and 28 seconds, 24 seconds faster than the base M4 and 20 seconds faster than the M3 GTS. This equates to the same time as a Porsche Carrera GT.

M4 DTM Champion Edition

The BMW M4 DTM Champion Edition was first launched in 2014, following the victory of Marco Wittmann in the 2014 DTM season, in commemoration of the winning BMW M4 DTM racecar. The model is based on Wittmann's 2014 M4 DTM in color. The 2014 DTM Champion Edition is limited to 23 units, Wittmann's race number.

After winning the 2016 season, BMW once again released a DTM Champion Edition of the M4. All performance data are identical to those of the GTS. It is limited to 200 units and is only available in white in keeping with the DTM car. The visual difference to the GTS lies in the smaller spoiler, less aggressive front splitter, the addition of canards on the front bumper as well as the omission of the orange design elements.

M4 CS

In early 2017, BMW announced M4 CS in limited run of 3,000 units globally with 1,000 units being delivered to the United States. The M4 CS sits between the M4 Competition Package and the M4 GTS. The M4 CS gets a total boost of 28 hp from its first generation (2014). This is done in part through the use of "compacted natural fiber" interior door panels with fabric latch pulls as seen in the M4 GTS, light weight M sport seats, and the removal of the central arm rest.

M4 Cabrio 30 Jahre Edition
This came in 2018 after it was initially released in 2016 for the BMW M3. This was limited to 300 units worldwide and celebrated 30 years of M3 convertible and M4 convertible driving. These cars came in Macao Blue, Mandarin II Uni and unique for the UK market a matte finished Frozen Dark Grey and the star-spoke 20-inch wheels came in bespoke Orbit Grey finish. Inside the finish came with two color option black and white and black and blue and these were fully extended leather. Also door sills and carbon interior had the 30 Jahre etched in. There were no performance changes but the car was based on the M4 Competition. These cars did not come with the 360 camera system as one of the key options that was not offered.

More Info

M4 Edition M Heritage
This is the final edition BMW made for the M4 Limited to 750 units and 75 were sent to the UK. The new M4 Edition M Heritage is based on the existing M4 Coupe and engine was based on the M4 Competition. These came in three colours Laguna Seca Blue, Velvet Blue metallic and Imola red and were only in coupe variants. The changes to this car were in the interior where they came in three color schemes white and black, red and black and blue and black with the words M4 Heritage embossed on the seats, door sills and carbon trim.

More Info

M4 Packages and Add-ons 
M Performance Parts can be fitted to all M4 models. These include the following: carbon fibre diffuser, a carbon fibre spoiler (F82 Only) (a flow through rear spoiler was also offered by BMW), a carbon fibre bumper winglet, a splitter, carbon fibre grills, carbon fibre engine cover, carbon fibre gear shifter, carbon fibre gear surround, carbon fibre and Alcantara handbrake, carbon fibre and Alcantara armrest,  M Performance carbon fibre door sills, decals and black side skirts.

Other additional options as a retrofit were LCI rear lights and Big Brake Carbon Kit, M Performance Exhaust System which all could be bought and fitted by BMW.

Second generation (G82/G83; 2021) 

The second iteration of the BMW M4 (codenamed G82) is a largely based on the standard 4 Series (G22 generation), which was previewed by the BMW Concept 4. It is a high performance version of the standard G22 4 Series. Prototypes of the BMW M4 have been seen tested on the Nürburgring beside the G80 BMW M3. The first units were assembled in November 2020, with global deliveries starting in early 2021.

The more notable upgrades for the G82 M4 is a  increase over the previous M4, as well as adopting the twin-kidney grille from the 4 Series.

The convertible version of the new M4 was introduced in May 2021. Like the standard new-generation BMW 4 Series Convertible, the M4 Convertible (internal designation G83) has a folding soft top. The convertible is available as a Competition model with the M xDrive.

For the North American market, only the manual will be available in the standard M4.

For the Thailand market, the manual will be available in the standard M4  and automatic will be available in the M4 Competition  they will be imported from Germany.

M Performance Parts 
M Performance Parts can be fitted to all models. These includes a wing, carbon fibre side skirts, an M Performance Exhaust system, canards, a carbon fibre splitter, a carbon fibre diffuser and rear ground effects. The M Performance currently released one set of design style that has been produced by many different factories. The G80 and G82 M3, M4 are the only G chassis M available with M performance design.

Special editions

M4 x KITH 
In October 2020, BMW released their collaboration with Kith, a lifestyle brand providing clothing items for children and adults, for the G80 generation M4. The car has been named BMW M4 x KITH. Production was limited to only 150 units worldwide and they have a slight premium over the basic form 2021 BMW M4. Slight differences are noticed on the seats with a specific colouration with kith embossed multiple times on the headrest, creating a specific pattern. The carbon roof has the Kith logo. Exterior-wise the car is fully matte black, silver and white.

M4 CSL 

At the 2017 Frankfurt Auto Show, head of BMW's M division Frank Van Meel announced that the CSL nameplate would be making a return, replacing the GTS in the performance model monikers. On May 4 of 2022, BMW announced that the M4 CSL would debut at the 2022 Concorso d'Eleganza Villa d'Este. Fast forward to May 2022, BMW M revealed the G82 M4 CSL. The latest M4 is now lighter and more powerful than its standard M4 counterpart. Only 1,000 units will be made.

3.0 CSL 

Motorsport

BMW M4 DTM 

The naturally-aspirated BMW M4 DTM competed in the Deutsche Tourenwagen Masters from 2014 to 2020. Marco Wittmann won the 2014 and 2016 championships.

BMW M4 GT4 

The BMW M4 GT4 is a competition version of the road car, sharing the 3.0 L turbocharged straight-six engine and 7-speed dual clutch transmission. Reuse of these elements of the road car, and of shared electronics systems including the TCS, are aimed at cost, maintenance, and driveability, with further race engineering reused from the GT3 version. The car debuted at the 2017 24 Hours of Nürburgring.

BMW M4 GT3 

The BMW M4 GT3 is a racecar version of the G82 BMW M4, homologated under the FIA Group GT3 category, which also enables entry to SRO, IMSA and ADAC competition. It is a direct successor to the BMW M6 GT3, racing from the 2022 season. The M4 GT3 will use a race-prepped variant of the inline-six from the road car. BMW M Motorsport stretches the front to add much wider fenders, and more angular styling for the hood accentuates the inward slanted brows above the headlights. The exhaust exits just ahead of the passenger side front wheel, on the right side of the car. At the back, there are inlets on the sides of the wider fenders. A gooseneck-mounted spoiler and rear diffuser manage the airflow. The steering wheel can be used in racing simulators without modifications. Deliveries started in late 2021.

References

External links 
 
 BMW M4 GT3 specifications
 BMW M4 road car and BMW M4 GT3

Compact executive cars
Coupés
Rear-wheel-drive vehicles
Cars introduced in 2014
Sports cars
M4